Ruimondo Mayer (30 December 1888 – September 1959) was a Portuguese fencer. He competed in the individual and team Épée events at the 1920 and 1924 Summer Olympics.

References

External links
 

1888 births
1959 deaths
Portuguese male épée fencers
Olympic fencers of Portugal
Fencers at the 1920 Summer Olympics
Fencers at the 1924 Summer Olympics
Sportspeople from Lisbon